Sharapovka is a rural locality (a village) in Alkinsky Selsoviet, Chishminsky District, Bashkortostan, Russia. The population was 26 as of 2010. There are 2 streets.

Geography 
Sharapovka is located 8 km northeast of Chishmy (the district's administrative centre) by road. Bogomolovka is the nearest rural locality.

References 

Rural localities in Chishminsky District